Wilson Cooke (1819 –1887), was an American politician and merchant. He was a member of the South Carolina House of Representatives during the Reconstruction era, serving from 1868 until 1870. A historical marker in Greenville commemorates his life.

Biography 
Wilson Cooke was born on 1819, his father was Vardry McBee, and his mother was enslaved. Cooke was born as a slave, and bought his freedom. 

He was a Methodist, and he helped co-found the Greenville Methodist Church, a Black church in 1862. Cooke became a general store owner and had a tannery. He was a delegate at the 1868 South Carolina Constitutional Convention in Charleston.

Cooke was married to Magdalena Walker. His son William Wilson Cooke was an architect and educator, who worked for the U.S. government before establishing his own practice in Gary, Indiana.

References

1819 births
1887 deaths
Members of the South Carolina House of Representatives
American freedmen
19th-century American politicians